Khalid Kaabi (born May 24, 1992) is a Saudi Arabian professional footballer who plays for Saudi Pro League club Al-Fayha as a winger.

Honours
Al Hilal
 King Cup: 2015
 Crown Prince Cup: 2015–16
 Saudi Super Cup: 2015

Al-Faisaly
King Cup: 2020–21

References

External links
Saudi League Profile

Living people
1992 births
Sportspeople from Riyadh
Association football wingers
Saudi Arabian footballers
Saudi Arabia international footballers
Al Hilal SFC players
Al-Shabab FC (Riyadh) players
Al-Faisaly FC players
Al-Fayha FC players
Saudi Professional League players